Yuval Avital (born in Jerusalem in 1977) is a composer, multimedia artist and guitarist known for his creations for large-scale compositions for numerous performers, multimedia contemporary operas involving indigenous cultures and collaborations with scientific institute such as NASA. In 2016 his icon-sonic opera Fuga Perpetua received the sponsorship of the UNHCR.

Biography 
Born in Jerusalem in 1977 and living in Milan, composer, multimedia artist and guitar player Yuval Avital develops his works in a variety of spaces, including public venues, industrial archaeological sites, theatres and museums, challenging the traditional crystallized categories that separate the arts.

His wide-ranging career includes the realization of monographic exhibitions, massive sonic works, sound and video installations of vast dimensions, collective performances involving sound masses in the creation of contemporary rituals, icon-sonic operas and artworks, complex multimedia frameworks, technological projects with the participation of scientists and usage of artificial intelligence, and compositions for soloists, choirs, orchestras and ensembles involving, sometimes, traditional masters of ancient cultures, dancers, performers and non-musicians.

Works 

Avital’s sound and visual artworks have been presented in museums, art foundations, venues and art events such as MANIFESTA Biennial, GAM - Torino, MACRO Museum of Contemporary Art Rome; OSTRALE Dresden Biennial, La Fabbrica del Cioccolato Foundation in Switzerland, Saint Antoine Church Istanbul, Marino Marini Museum in Florence; National Science and Technology Museum “Leonardo da Vinci” in Milan.
He is the author of large-scale Installations such as ALMA MATER - the largest sound installation in Italian history, the artwork covers an area of 1200 sqm with a “forest” of 140 loudspeakers, projections and light (Fabbrica del Vapore, Milan 2015); permanent Sound Sculptures such as THE RATTLES GARDEN - composed of fifty wrought-iron wheat-like sculptures and olive trees on which are hanged 180 bells and rattles from every part of the Mediterranean (Mulinum San Floro, Calabria) and OPEN FENCE - a massive Sound-Sculpture (biggest in Italy), of 320 tubular bells, 64 meters long and 4 meters high, playable by 80 visitors simultaneously (East End Studios, Milan).

Different works of Avital are dedicated to humanitarian issues such as his Opera Fuga Perpetua (2016) whose protagonists are refugees, which is endorsed by United Nations UNHCR; and his Opera Giobbe [Job, 2018 ] (איוב), commissioned by the Italian Government and the Italian the chairmanship of the IHRA (International Holocaust Remembrance Alliance) in occasion of the 80th anniversary of the promulgation of the racial laws, In which he connected the holocaust to the genocides which followed afterwards till today.

His latest sound and visual artwork is HUMAN SIGNS, a Global participatory online dance and voice artwork, conceived in time of COVID-19, with the participation of over 180 artists from over 47 countries presented digitally in MANIFESTA 13 Marseille as a part of Real Utopias exhibition.

Monographic Exhibitions 
 THREE GRADES OF FOREIGNNESS (22/04/2017 - 30/09/2017) - exhibition of three installations with a video polyptych of 7 parallel video projections, a land installation, a sonic camera obscura and visual artworks. Extended over the 2300sqm of the Fabbrica del Cioccolato Foundation in Switzerland, the exhibition explores the difficult relationship between man and nature, more specifically how they are alienated from one another, in conflict and then reunited.
 VARIATIONS ON HARMONIC TREMOR: ICON-SONIC ETNA (09/11/2017 - 30/11/2017) - exhibition of two installations with a video polyptych, a sound sculpture and hundreds of icon-sonic postcards. Hosted by the National Museum of Science and Technology "Leonardo da Vinci" in Milan, this exhibition is a tribute to the multifaceted beauty of the territory around the Etna volcano, and to the people that have learnt how to co-exist with this tumultuous and incredible land.
 NEPHILIM, a solo exhibition of 60 Singing Masks sound sculptures created in dialogue with 24 Tuscan master artisans. Marino Marini Museum, Florence; October 10, 2019 - December 31, 2019; opening event of Ostrale Biennial of Contemporary Art in 2019, two large-scale multimedia installations and a photographic section.

Massive Sonic Works 
 MISE EN ABÎME - massive sonic work n.1. For a crowd of 100 people, 34 accordions, 2 bass tuba, bass clarinet, soprano, percussions, didgeridoo & four conductors (2011). Premiere: March 2011 | Recording in RAI (Italian National Broadcast Network) studios in Milan, Italy. Conductors: Sandro Gorli, Pilar Bravo, Nicola Scaldaferri, Dario Garegnani. Duration: 70 minutes.
 GARON - massive sonic work n.2. For 40 tubas, 5 contrabass tuba soloists, 6 percussions, choir, extended vocal technique soloists & live electronics. (2012), a dialogue between instruments that amplify spectator's experience, dedicated to Anish Kapoor. Duration - 57 minutes approx. Premiere : 26/01/2012 | Closing concert Dirty corner by Anish Kapoor | La Fabbrica del Vapore | Milan, Italy. Conductors: Sandro Gorli, Dario Garegnani, Elena Casella.
 KARAGATAN - massive sonic work n.3. For 100 traditional gong & bamboo performers. Premiere: 21/01/2013 | Closing concert of Tunog Tugan Festival| Dipolog City| Mindanao, Philippines. Conductor: Chino Toledo. Duration: 30–40 minutes.
 REKA - massive sonic work n.4. For six traditional singers, two percussions and a crowd of hundreds of people. Commissioned by Warsaw Autumn Festival. Premiere: September 2014 | MITO SettembreMusica & Warsaw Autumn Festivals | Milan, Italy & Warsaw, Poland. Duration: 70–75 minutes.
 REQUIEM MONUMENTALE: PART I - two parallel compositions: choir of 14 voices and marching brass band of 100 elements. Commissioned by Amici del Monumentale. Premiere: 14 May 2017, Monumental Cemetery of Milan.
 OPEN FENCE - sound sculpture: 12 tons of weight, 64 metres of length, 4 metres of height, over 320 tubular bells. Inauguration: 21 June 2017 at the East End Studios of Milan.

Installations 
 ALMA MATER - in dialogue with “Il Terzo Paradiso” by Michelangelo Pistoletto: massive sonic work consisting of a forest of 140 loudspeakers, legendary étoiles of Teatro alla Scala and lacemakers. First edition under the patronage of EXPO 2015 and the city of Milan, July 8 - August 29, La Fabbrica del Vapore, Milan, Italy. Duration: unlimited.
 FOREIGN BODIES - video polyptych of 7 parallel projections, 14 loudspeakers & visuals. The major installation in Avital's Three Grades of Foreignness at the Fabbrica del Cioccolato Foundation, this work was realised in collaboration with 7 ballet étoiles. 
 LANDS - ring of loudspeakers and soil. The second installation of Avital's Three Grades of Foreignness. 
 REH'EM - sonic camera obscura. Third installation of Avital's Three Grades of Foreignness, it was realised in an old elevator shaft, filled with sounds of the heartbeats of Avital's newborn and seismic vibrations of the earth.
 ICON-SONIC POSTCARDS: TRIPTYCH N.1 (15/10/2017 - 05/11/2017) - video polyptych on 3 flat panel displays and 6 loudspeakers. Commissioned by Festival Aperto in Reggio Emilia.

Icon-Sonic Operas 
 KOLOT: icon/sonic opera N.1, for 12 traditional singers, soloists ensemble, video & electronics. Premiere: Opening event of REC festival, Cavalerizza reale, Reggio Emilia, Italy; Teatro dal Verme, Milan, Italy; opening event of the XXVI edition of the European Theatre Festival, Teatro Due, Parma, Spazio Grande Teatro 2 Parma, Italy 2008. Conductors: Yuval Avital, Nori Jacoby. Duration: 70 minutes.
 SAMARITANS: icon/sonic opera N.2, for a soloists ensemble, Samaritans choir, video & electronics. Conductor: Massimo Mazza. Premiere: MiTo SettembreMusica Festival, Teatro Nuovo, Milan, Italy, September 2010.
 LEILIT: nocturno icon/sonic opera N.3 for a recorders consort: contrabass in F, bass in C, bass in F, tenor, soprano & 2 sopranino; accordion consort (7 elements); piano; bowed piano; guitar soloist; 2 Keis cantors & Video (2011). Duration: 40 minutes.
 Noise for Syd: icon/sonic opera N.4 for 7 musicians, light designer, visual artist, 2 dancers, video & electronics. Premiere: Festival Aperto, Cavalerizza reale, Reggio Emilia, Italy, 2013. Duration: 30 minutes.
 RIVERS:  performance for a vocal crowd of refugees and loudspeakers. Premiere: Opening of Terzo Paradiso Center by Michelangelo Pistoletto, Biella, Italy 26 September 2015; Museo Marino Marini, Florence, Italy 04 May 2019; GAM - Torino and Barriera di Milano, Tourin, Italy 29 - 30 September 2020. Duration: unlimited.
 Fuga Perpetua: icon-sonic Opera for an ensemble, visuals, mobile sound theater and a vocal crowd. Performing: Meitar Ensemble, with the sponsorship of UNHCR and of the International Theatre Institute, UNESCO. Duration: 82 minutes. Premiere: Teatro Comunale “L. Pavarotti” Modena, Italy 12 March 2016. UK Premieres: Brighton Festival, Brighton, May 2016 and NEAT Festival, Nottingham, May 2016.
 SILENT QUARTET: icon-sonic opera for a string quartet and video art. Performing: Quartetto Lyskamm. Duration: 60 minutes. Premiere: Anteo spazioCinema, 31 May 2016, Milan, Italy.

Compositions for indigenous ensemble 
Works for indigenous ensembles involve contemporary music and ancient traditions, they are a big part of Avital’s creations and researches. These projects seek a dialogue between cultures that seem distant in the common perception and the enhancement of unknown traditions. They enrich the contemporary musical language by presenting exciting sonorities, diverse esthetics, new instruments and vocal styles. Hence, contemporary works with ancient traditions or indigenous ensembles bring with them a meaningful value from a social, ethical, cultural and musical point of view.
 Slow Horizons: music for 12 Kazakh indigenous players, storyteller, 2 dancers, Almaty, Kazakhstan, "Nauryz 21" Central Asia 21 century music in May 2006.
 After the darkness: closing event for the 2nd International Rondalla Festival, Bogio, Philippines, February 2007. Yuval Avital - composition, direction, Yizhar Karshon - harpsichord; male choir, indigenous gongs & bamboo ensemble from the town of Bogio.
 Lefkara Moirai: for traditionals ensemble, 2 singers, guitar, 12 craftsmen, video, narrator, and live electronics. Premiere: Lefkara Festival, Lefkara, Cyprus 2009.

Chamber/Orchestra/Soloists 

His Operas, symphonic and chamber works were performed by numerous soloists and ensembles, presented in concert halls and festivals such as London Design Festival, Brighton Festival, Warsaw Autumn Festival, MiTo SettembreMusica Milan, Tel Aviv Museum, Opera House L.Pavarotti, Musiktheater im Revier Gelsenkirchen, RomaEuropa, National Conservatory of China, Centre Pompidou, Palazzo Reale of Milan, and Quinta da Regaleira Palace (Portugal).

Orchestra 
 OTOT: icon-sonic symphony for extended chamber orchestra, 5 percussions, 3 accordions, visuals & live electronics. World premiere: opening of the symphonic season of Teatro Sociale di Como, Italy, January 2013. Duration: 55–65 minutes.

Soloist with orchestra 
 Hope studies
 Concert for viola & orchestra (2010-2012)

Chamber music 
 Music for 7 N.1 - "Cycles" for seven tenor recorders ensemble. In memory of Jose Monserrat Maceda. Premiere: RomaEuropa Festival, Teatro Palladium, Rome, Italy, October 2011. Performing: The Running Seven Recorders Ensemble. Duration: 17 minutes.
 Music for 7 N.2 - "Modus benedictus" for seven cellos. In memory of Nusrat Fateh Ali Khan, 2009. Unperformed works. Duration: 22 minutes approx.
 Music for 7 N.3 - "Un porto griggio" for seven contrabass tuba. Dedicated to Bjork (2009/2014). Conductor: Antonio Macciomei. Premiere: 4° Italian Low Brass Festival, Auditorium G.Verdi, Segrate, Italy, April 2014. Duration: 30 minutes.
 Music for 7 N.4 - "Al mishkavi" for 7 copper plates and seven voices. Dedicated to Shlomo Avital (2008 - 2009). Unperformed works. Duration: 27 minutes approx.
 Music for 7 N.5 - "Sunset" for 7 violins. In memory of Abel Ehrlich (2010). Unperformed works. Duration: 22 minutes approx.
 Music for 7 N.6 - "Horror vacui" for seven accordions. Dedicated to Pauline Oliveros (2011). Premiere: RomaEuropa Festival, Teatro Palladium, Roma, Italy, October 2011. Performing: Sergio Scappini, Michele Bracciali, Nadio Marenco, Giancarlo Calabria, Augusto Comminesi, Paolo Vignani. Duration: 15.30 minutes.
 Seven demons of drought for piano and percussions, 2010.
 HORIZON & SIREN for alto sax & viola. Premiere: Cantiere Internazionale d'Arte, Montepulciano, Italy July 2015. Duration: 25 minutes.
 Kolà (her voice) for violin and piano. Duration: 18 minutes.

Solo works 
 BDIDUT for scordatura guitar. Premiere. Toronto Performing Arts Center, George Washington hall, Canada, October, 2007. Duration: 12 minutes.
 ENVIRONMENTS EXPLORATION solo performance. Premiere Miami Art Basel, Casa Fendi, Miami, USA, December 2007.
 DIMDUM for bass flute (2010). Premiere: Frazione Saliana, Pianello del Lario, Como, 2011. Soloist: Gianluigi Nuccini. Duration: 17 minutes.
 "Dream, shadows and passages", piano sonata (2010-2011). Premiere: RomaEuropa Festival, Teatro Palladium, Roma, Ottobre 2011. Performing: Maria Grazia Bellocchio. Duration: 21 minutes.
 Utopie N.1 for percussions, video & Tape. Premiere: Conservatorio G. Verdi, Milan, Italy. 04/09/2013. Performing: Lorenzo Colombo. Duration: 27 minutes.
 KANAF for Bass clarinet, tape & live electronics (2011–13). Premiere: Spain 2015. Performing: Paolo de Gaspari. Duration: 21 minutes.

Electro-acoustic & multimedia works

Electro-acoustic composition 
“Theatrum Mundi” by Daniel Libeskind and “Meditations on Theatrum Mundi” by Yuval Avital, London Design Festival, MSCTY EXPO, 12 - 20 September 2020.

Global Multimedia Participatory artwork 
HUMAN SIGNS - Global Multimedia Participatory artwork of voice and gesture - with over 180 artists from over 46 countries, presented online through audiovisual ensembles on different formats and platforms, March 2020 - Ongoing. Opening at MANIFESTA 13 Biennial, Real Utopias exhibition as “A Door to Human Signs” (2020, Marseille).

Installations & live performance 
 “Background” for ensemble and tape, Biella, 2006.
 Cariatidi Sonore Premiere: special production for the Notte Bianca festival, Stazione Ostiense, Roma, Italy, 2007.
 Masà for Tape, live electronics, guitar, and various electro-acoustic instruments. Premiere: Sala Puccini, Milan 2008, in collaboration with Riccardo Sinigaglia.
 Kanaf for elaborated bass clarinet & taper. Clarinet: Paolo de Gasperi (2011).
 Alpha - Uniform infinite sonic tree for 8 speakers and artificial intelligence system in collaboration with Giovanni Cospito, 2012.
 Spaces Unfolded for infinite sonic tree for 8 speakers (in collaboration with Giovanni Cospito). Premiere: Bergamo science festival, December 2012. Duration: unlimited.
 Unfolding Space: Concerto for electric & classic guitar, live electronics, video and sonic translations of the cosmic space. In collaboration with NASA & ESA scientists. Duration 60 minutes. Premiere BergamoScienza, Italy, October 2012. Duration 60 minutes.
 Utopie N.1 for percussions, video & Tape. Soloist: Lorenzo Colombo. Premiere: Conservatorio G. Verdi, Milan, Italy, September 2013.
 Silent Quartet: Icon-sonic chamber work for string quartet, video, tape & live electronics. Performers: Xenia Ensemble. Premiere: Est-Ovest Festival (commission), Turin & Genoa, Italy, October 2014.
 FIELDS - installation for tape. Premiere: I Maestri del Paesaggio, Piazza Vecchia & Giardino Tresoldi, Bergamo, Italy 05-20 September 2015.
 MULTIPLICATIONS N.1 for viola, Saxophone, Percussions, analogue synthesizer & live mixing. Commission: Tempo Reale Premiere: Closing event of Tempo Reale Festival, Florence, Italy 10 October 2015. Duration: 21+ minutes.
FOREIGN BODIES ICONS - Opening performance at Woolbridge Gallery with Accademia Teatro alla Scala dancers 2020, Dresden Biennial Ostrale 2019.

Electronic works 
 Yom (2007)
 Ensof (2007)
 Caves of Winds (2008)
 Voices never-ending (2008)
 Shir leShlomo (2014)

Music for Dance/Theater 
 Bdidut: with choreographer & Dancer Chiara Rosenthal, Insoliti International Festival and the XXVII International Review of Integrated Arts and Dance “Il gesto e l'anima”, Teatro nuovo, Turin, Italy 2004.
 Hamesh: for two actors, guitar, percussions, winds and electronic music (composed by Y.A, texts curated by A. Mazzolotti), World Premiere: 4 September 2005, Vercelli, Italy.
 PACKMAN VS. ESCHER for 16 dancers. Performances at Biarteca festival, Biella, Italy, 2006, 2007.
 Music for choreography of Cave Canem by Avi kaisere and Sergio Antonino, for guitar, electronics and dancer choir. Germany, 2007.
 Music for the theater show "L’ultimo viaggio di Sinbad" by Erri De Luca, Italy, 2009. Live electronics. Director: Marcello Zagaria. Premiere “Festa del teatro 2009” - IV edition, Spazio MIL, Milan, Italy.
 Corpo: installation for two dancers, video & live electronics, Fondazione A. Pomodoro, Milan, Italy, 2010.
 Music for the theater show "Una notte in Tunisia" by Vitaliano Trevisan. Director: Andrée Ruth Shammah. Italy, 2011.

Guitar
Graduated in the Jerusalem music Academy and later a part of Angelo Gilardino soloists class, under the tutorship of M° Angelo Gilardino & M° Luigi Biscaldi, Avital performed around the world for several years. After that he has focused on creating his own original compositions and on collaborations with masters and soloists of both creative and traditional music. Avital uses elements from the tradition of stringed instruments in the Middle East, Central Asia and Far East, combined with extended techniques for classical guitar.

Collaborations 
Yuval Avital’s work is focused on the research of intercultural relations, based on dialogue as a way to show hidden symmetries and complementarity inherent in the culture. Avital’s operas try to unite, through an ideal “bridge”, non-western musical cultures, traditional artists and custodians of ancient cultures around the world. His research of new forms of musical expressions through dialogue gave birth, in 2006, to Trialogo Festival, where masters of ancient traditions, dance, jazz, classical and electric music and many other discipline meet to create a new opera or a common project.

References

Bibliography 
 
 C. Cupchik, Gerald (2016), "Creative Practices of Contemporary Artists: Yuval Avital", The Aesthetics of Emotion: Up the Down Staircase of the Mind-Body, Cambridge University Press,

External links 
 Youtube Official Channel
 Yuval Avital Official Site
 Magà Global Arts Official Site
 Vimeo Official Channel

Experimental musicians
Israeli guitarists
Israeli composers
1977 births
Living people
Multimedia artists
21st-century guitarists